Mathias Bonsach Krogh Nannestad (14 October 1815 – 17 March 1878) was a Norwegian civil servant and politician.  He served as the Diocesan Governor of Tromsø stiftamt from 1858 until 1869. He also served simultaneously as the County Governor of both Finnmark and Tromsø counties from 1858 until 1866. In 1866, Jens Holmboe took over as County Governor of Finnmark and Nannestad continued on as the County Governor of Tromsø county until his retirement in 1869.

References

1815 births
1878 deaths
County governors of Norway